Pueblo Alto ("High Village" in Spanish) is an Ancestral Puebloan great house and archaeological site located in Chaco Culture National Historical Park, northwestern New Mexico, United States. The complex, comprising 89 rooms in a single-story layout, is located on a mesa top near the middle of Chaco Canyon; 0.6 miles (1 km) from Pueblo Bonito, it was begun between AD 1020 and 1050. Its location made the community visible to most of the inhabitants of the San Juan Basin; indeed, it was only 2.3 miles (3.7 km) north of Tsin Kletsin, on the opposite side of the canyon. The community was the center of a bead- and turquoise-processing industry that influenced the development of all villages in the canyon; chert tool production was also common. It shares its mesa with another great house, Nuevo Alto, both of which are now protected within the borders of Chaco Culture National Historical Park. Storerooms at Pueblo Alto opened to the outside rather than into the interior rooms and there was a huge midden of pottery. This and chert found in the midden came mostly from the Chuska area 70 km (43 mi) to the west.

Usage 
Research suggests that as few as five to twenty families lived in the complex; this may imply that Pueblo Alto served a primarily non-residential role.

Notes

References

External links 
 Pueblo Alto, a Photo Gallery

Colorado Plateau
Chaco Canyon
Former populated places in New Mexico
Pueblo great houses
Chaco Culture National Historical Park
Ancestral Puebloans
Pueblos in New Mexico